Ra is the thirteenth studio album by German rock band Eloy. Released in 1988, it was the first album to be released after a four-year absence.

Track listing
All tracks written by Eloy (Frank Bornemann/Michael Gerlach) except where noted.
 "Voyager of the Future Race"  – 9:03
 "Sensations"  – 5:13
 "Dreams"  – 8:09
 "Invasion of a Megaforce" (Bornemann/Gieseler)  – 7:45
 "Rainbow" (Bornemann/Gieseler)  – 5:23
 "Hero"  – 6:53

Personnel

Band members
Frank Bornemann – guitar, lead vocals,
Michael Gerlach – keyboards, bass synthesizer, drums

Guest musicians
Achim Gieseler – keyboards (4, 5)
Stefan Höls – bass (4), backing vocals (3, 5)
Darryl van Raalte – fretless bass (3)
Paul Harriman – bass (2)
Anette Stangenberg – lead vocals (3, 4, 5)
Diana Baden – whispers (3)
Tommy Newton – guitars (2)
Udo Dahmen – drums (4)
Sue Wist – vocal intro (1)

Production
Engineered & mixed by Fritz Hilpert
Produced by Frank Bornemann

References

1988 albums
Eloy (band) albums